The Georgia Southern Eagles men's basketball team is the basketball team that represents Georgia Southern University in Statesboro, Georgia, United States.  The school's team currently competes in the Sun Belt Conference and is coached by Charlie Henry.

Postseason results

NCAA tournament
The Eagles have appeared in three NCAA tournaments. Their combined record is 0–3.

NIT
The Eagles have appeared in three National Invitation Tournaments (NIT). Their combined record is 0–3.

CBI
The Eagles have appeared in one College Basketball Invitational (CBI). Their record is 0–1.

Eagles in the NBA
3 former Georgia Southern players have played at least one game in the NBA.

References

External links